The Representation of Natives Act No 12 of 1936 (commenced 10 July) was legislation passed in South Africa which further reduced black rights at the time.
The Cape province had a qualified franchise which had allowed a small number of blacks in the Cape to vote for the common roll (although not to sit in parliament) in terms of the Cape Qualified Franchise. The qualified franchise dated back to the pre-Union period, when the Cape was a separate British colony; it also excluded poorer white men. The 1936 Act removed blacks to  a separate roll – and halted the right to run for office; other earlier legislation removed the qualifications imposed in the Cape on whites.

With this act, the small black elite - most blacks never had the vote - were removed from the common rolls on which they had been able to register since 1854. Chiefs, local councils, urban advisory boards and election committees in all provinces were to elect four whites to the senate by a system of block voting. The act also created a Native Representative Council of six white officials, four nominated and twelve elected Africans.

Repeal
This Act was repealed on 19 June 1959 by the Promotion of Bantu Self-government Act, 1959.

See also
 :Category:Apartheid laws in South Africa
 Apartheid in South Africa

References

External links
 African History: Apartheid Legislation in South Africa
 Racial Legislation in South Africa 1806-1947

Apartheid laws in South Africa
1936 in South African law
Election law in South Africa